William Horsman (18 December 1906 – 1982) was an English professional footballer who played as an outside right and scored 37 goals from 230 appearances in the Football League.

Horsman was born in Doncaster, West Riding of Yorkshire. He made 79 appearances in the First Division for Birmingham before joining Chester in 1935. He helped them finish as runners-up in the Third Division North in 1935–36 and reach the final of the Welsh Cup in the same season. His career was ended prematurely by the outbreak of the Second World War.

References

1906 births
1982 deaths
Footballers from Doncaster
English footballers
Association football outside forwards
Selby Town F.C. players
Birmingham City F.C. players
Chester City F.C. players
Date of death missing
Place of death missing